Adrien Saussez (born 25 August 1991) is a Belgian professional footballer who plays as a goalkeeper for Francs Borains.

Career
Saussez started playing football for Mons. He became a free agent in July 2015, after the formal bankruptcy of the club. In January 2016, he signed with Tubize. After six months at the club, he joined Union Saint-Gilloise.

In November 2021, Saussez signed with Francs Borains after first goalkeeper Maxime Vandermeulen suffered a hip injury.

References

External links

1991 births
Living people
Belgian footballers
Association football goalkeepers
Challenger Pro League players
Belgian Third Division players
R.A.E.C. Mons players
A.F.C. Tubize players
Royale Union Saint-Gilloise players
Francs Borains players
Footballers from Hainaut (province)
Sportspeople from Mons